Aliens in a Bebop Planet is a double album by jazz pianist Roberto Magris released on the JMood label in 2012, featuring performances by Magris with his Space Trek from Kansas City.

Reception

The DownBeat review by John Ephland awarded the album 3 ½ stars and simply states: "Aliens in a Bebop Planet has the feel of a musical theater revue, but that doesn’t come through until the very end. Before that, we are treated to a variety of mainstream jazz styles. As for the title of the package, a better one might be Beboppers on an Alien Planet. But kicking it all off is a signature sound on piano that suggests yet another 'planet'”.

Track listing
CD 1
 Blues Clues on the Lunar Sand (Roberto Magris) – 4:33 
 Across the Borders / Beyond the Faith (Roberto Magris) – 6:44 
 A Night in Cydonia (Roberto Magris) – 5:12 
 Nostalgia (Fats Navarro) – 4:26 
 On Cloud Nine (Roberto Magris) – 6:05 
 Sat (Roberto Magris) – 6:45 
 Robbin's Space Bolero (Sir Charles Thompson) – 7:01 
 Aliens in a Bebop Planet Roberto (Magris) – 5:23 
 Chachanada (Roberto Magris) – 6:35

CD 2
 New Cos City (PJ Aubree Collins/Roberto Magris) – 4:33 
 Signals and Prayers (Roberto Magris) – 4:08 
 The Gypsy (Billy Reid) – 5:32 
 Nobody Knows (Kenny Clarke) – 3:47 
 Cosmic Storyville (Roberto Magris) – 3:42 
 Giant Steps (John Coltrane) – 5:07 
 Rhythms from the Floating Space (Roberto Magris) – 3:14 
 On Cloud Nine Duet (Roberto Magris) – 6:12 
 Saturn Sun Ra (Roberto Magris) – 3:54
 Audio Notebook – 19:00

Personnel

Musicians
Matt Otto – tenor sax
Roberto Magris – piano
Dominique Sanders – bass
Brian Steever – drums
Pablo Sanhueza – congas and percussion (on # 3, 4, 6–9, 11, 12, 16, 18)
Eddie Charles – vocal (on # 8, 10, 13)

Production
 Paul Collins – executive producer and producer
 George Hunt – engineering
 Stephen Bocioaca – design
 Jerry Lockett – photography

References

Roberto Magris albums
2012 albums